The 1986 Cork Intermediate Hurling Championship was the 77th staging of the Cork Intermediate Hurling Championship since its establishment by the Cork County Board in 1909. The draw for the opening round fixtures took place on 26 January 1986. The championship ran from 10 May to 17 August 1986.

On 17 August 1986, Cloughduv won the championship following a 2–12 to 0–11 defeat of Erin's Own in the final at Páirc Uí Chaoimh. This as their fifth championship title overall and their first title since 1983.

Cloughduv's Don O'Leary was the championship's top scorer with 2-27.

Results

First round

Second round

Quarter-finals

Semi-finals

Final

Championship statistics

Top scorers

Overall

In a single game

References

Cork Intermediate Hurling Championship
Cork Intermediate Hurling Championship